Branko Mitrovic is a Serbian-Norwegian architectural historian and theorist who has backgrounds in both philosophy and architecture. Currently, he teaches history and theory of architecture at the Department of Architecture and Technology in the Norwegian University of Science and Technology. His main concern is the relationship between philosophical views and architectural theory focusing on visuality and philosophy of history 
He had achieved many honors and fellowships including Humboldt Research Award (2008), Harvard University research fellowship, Senior Fellowship of National Gallery of Art in Washington.

Education
He completed his Bachelor degrees in both architecture (1988) and philosophy (1992) from the University of Belgrade in Serbia. Then he moved to the University of Pennsylvania to continue his education in master of architecture. After that he received two PhDs, one from the University of Pennsylvania in Architecture (1996) and another from the University of Auckland in Philosophy (2007).

Bibliography 
 Mitrovic, Branko. (2020) Materialist Philosophy of History. A Realist Antidote to Postmodernism. Lexington Books. ISBN 978179362002
 Mitrovic, Branko. (2015) Rage and Denials. Collectivist Philosophy, Politics and Art Historiography, 1890-1947. Penn State University Press. 
 Visuality for Architects: Architectural Creativity and Modern Theories of Perception and Imagination. (2013). University of Virginia Press.  
 Mitrovic, Branko. (2011) Philosophy for Architects. Princeton Architectural Press. .
 Mitrovic, Branko. (2005) Serene Greed of the Eye. Leon Battista Alberti and the Philosophical Foundations of Renaissance Architectural Theory. Deutscher Kunstverlag.  . 
 Mitrovic, Branko. (2004) Learning from Palladio. W.W. Norton. .

References 

Living people
Year of birth missing (living people)
Place of birth missing (living people)
Serbian emigrants to Norway
Norwegian architectural historians
Architectural theoreticians
Academic staff of the Norwegian University of Science and Technology
Humboldt Research Award recipients
University of Belgrade alumni
University of Pennsylvania alumni
University of Auckland alumni
New Classical architects